UFC 45: Revolution was a mixed martial arts event held by the Ultimate Fighting Championship on November 21, 2003, at the Mohegan Sun Casino in Uncasville, Connecticut. The event was broadcast live on pay-per-view in the United States, and later released on DVD.

History
This event marked the 10th anniversary of the UFC and to celebrate the anniversary the UFC inaugurated its Hall of Fame, with Royce Gracie and Ken Shamrock as the first inductees. UFC President Dana White said; "We feel that no two individuals are more deserving than Royce and Ken to be the charter members. Their contributions to our sport, both inside and outside the Octagon, may never be equaled.”

In addition, ten fighters were chosen by fans to receive a Viewer's Choice Award during the event; they were Royce Gracie, Ken Shamrock, Randy Couture, Tank Abbott, Mark Coleman, Pat Miletich, Marco Ruas, Dan Severn, Don Frye and Oleg Taktarov.

Frank Mir was scheduled to fight Tim Sylvia in a UFC Heavyweight Championship fight, then Wes Sims in a UFC 43 rematch, and finally, UFC 1 & 2 veteran Patrick Smith at this event, but each fighter was pulled from the card, resulting in Mir's withdrawal as well.

Results

See also 
 Ultimate Fighting Championship
 List of UFC champions
 List of UFC events
 2003 in UFC

External links 
 Official UFC Website
 Official UFC event results
 Sherdog event results

References

Ultimate Fighting Championship events
Events in Uncasville, Connecticut
2003 in mixed martial arts
Mixed martial arts in Connecticut
Sports in Uncasville, Connecticut
2003 in sports in Connecticut